Harand may refer to:

Harand, Iran
Harand, Pakistan